KUTI (1460 AM) is a radio station broadcasting a sports format to the Yakima, Washington, United States area. The station is now owned by Townsquare Media. The station reaches all parts of the Yakima Valley area. It airs programming from ESPN Radio. The 1460 frequency was first occupied by KIMA, which started operations on October 19, 1944. When KUTI went on the air on 980, it was owned by Wally Nelskog, with a rock and roll format. Before the switch to 1460, KUTI was formerly KMWX, with a country-western format. 980 kHz is now KTCR.

In 1957, Harrison A. Roddick bought KUTI and played classical music. So few listeners tuned in that the station did not attract enough advertisers to keep going, and Roddick had to sell the station at a loss.

Its call-letters changed to KMWX in 1969. Throughout the 1980s and 1990s, it broadcast an oldies format with hourly updates from the NBC Radio News Network. The oldies formatted station KMWX was also used on the Yakima TCI Cablevision Program Guide back in the 1990s. KMWX primarily played hits from the 1960s and 1970s, and later added some 1980s.

References

External links
Official website

Sports radio stations in the United States
UTI
UTI
Townsquare Media radio stations